This award honors members of the Meteoritical Society who have advanced the goals of the Society to promote research and education in meteoritics and planetary science in ways other than by conducting scientific research.  Examples of activities that could be honored by the award include, but are not limited to, education and public outreach, service to the Society and the broader scientific community, and acquisition, classification and curation of new samples for research. This award may be given annually, and should be given at least every other year. Winners will be granted lifetime membership in the Meteoritical Society.

Meteoritical Society's Service Award Winners

See also

 List of astronomy awards
 Glossary of meteoritics

References

Astronomy prizes
Meteorite prizes